El médico módico ("The Moderate Doctor") is a 1971 Mexican comedy film directed by Gilberto Martínez Solares and produced by Miguel Zacarías. It is the ninth film starring Gaspar Henaine alone as Capulina (without Marco Antonio Campos as Viruta). Karla, Eric del Castillo, and Óscar Ortiz de Pinedo are also featured.

Cast
Gaspar Henaine as Capulina
Nora Larraga as Carmen (credited as Karla)
Eric del Castillo as Luigi
Óscar Ortiz de Pinedo as Don Arsenio
Juan Gallardo as Juan
Pancho Córdova as The Hospital Director
Ramón G. Larrea as Eufemio Gallínazo (credited as Ramón Larrea)	 
Betty Velázquez as The Cashier Nurse (credited as Bety Velázquez)	
Nathanael León as Luigi's Henchman (as Nothanael León)
Juan Garza as Luigi's Henchman
Armando Acosta as The Policeman	  
Guillermo Bravo Sosa as Melquiádes (credited as Guillermo Bravo)
Irma Torres as The Infarcted Woman	 	
Francisco Meneses as The Infarcted Woman's Husband		
Arturo Silva

External links

Mexican comedy films
1971 comedy films
1971 films
1970s Mexican films